Fingal mac Gofraid, and his father, Gofraid mac Sitriuc, were late eleventh-century rulers of the Kingdom of the Isles. Although one source states that Gofraid mac Sitriuc's father was named Sitriuc, there is reason to suspect that this could be an error of some sort. There is also uncertainty as to which family Gofraid mac Sitriuc belonged to. One such family, descended from Amlaíb Cúarán, King of Northumbria and Dublin, appears to have cooperated with Diarmait mac Maíl na mBó, King of Leinster. Another family, that of Echmarcach mac Ragnaill, King of Dublin and the Isles, opposed Amlaíb Cúarán's apparent descendants, and was closely connected with Diarmait's adversaries, the Uí Briain kindred.

If Gofraid mac Sitriuc was a descendant of Amlaíb Cúarán, it could mean that he was installed in the Isles by Diarmait after the latter oversaw the apparent expulsion of Echmarcach in the 1060s. Membership of this family may also explain apparent amiable relationship that Gofraid mac Sitriuc and Fingal appear to have enjoyed with Gofraid Crobán, their immediate successor in the Isles. It could also explain an attack on Mann in 1073, conducted by a possible the Uí Briain and a possible kinsman of Echmarcach. On the other hand, if Gofraid mac Sitriuc was a close kinsman of Echmarcach, it is possible that he is identical to Gofraid ua Ragnaill, King of Dublin, a contemporary ruler who is known to have reigned in Dublin during a period of Uí Briain overlordship after Diarmait's death. This identification could mean that Gofraid ua Ragnaill immediately succeeded Echmarcach in both Dublin and the Isles.

Gofraid mac Sitriuc is stated in one source to have died in about 1070, after which Fingal succeeded him. Fingal later appears to have fended off an attack upon Mann by men with Irish connections. At some point in the 1070s the kingdom was conquered by Gofraid Crobán, although the circumstances of this event are uncertain. Whilst it is possible that the latter overthrew Fingal, this is by no means certain. In fact, the throne may well have been vacant when Gofraid Crobán conducted his campaigns to gain the kingship. Whatever the case, there is reason to suspect that descendants of Fingal ruled the Kingdom of the Rhinns following his demise.

Uncertain parentage and identity

Gofraid mac Sitriuc is specifically mentioned twice by the Chronicle of Mann: once as "", and once as "". Although these passages seem to show that his father's name was Sitriuc, the first instance of "" is crossed out, and the corresponding marginal notes beside both passages read "". These passages, therefore, may be evidence that Gofraid mac Sitriuc was either the son of a man named Sitriuc, or else the son of a man named Fingal. It is also possible that the marginal note refers to a place name rather than a personal name. For example, the notes could refer to Fine Gall, Dublin's agriculturally rich northern hinterland. The notes, therefore, could be evidence that Gofraid mac Sitriuc was a native Dubliner rather than a Manxman. If Gofraid mac Sitriuc's father was indeed named Sitriuc, there are several contemporaneous candidates.

One particular candidate is Sitriuc mac Ímair, King of Waterford, however there is no evidence that this man had a son named Gofraid. Another candidate is Sitriuc mac Amlaíb, King of Dublin. Although this man is known to have had a son named Gofraid, the latter is recorded to have been killed in 1036. This Sitriuc, however, is known to have had two sons named Amlaíb, one who died in 1013, and the other who died in 1036. In fact, it was not uncommon for parents to have several children with the same name, and it is possible that Sitriuc mac Amlaíb was the father of not only two Amlaíbs but two Gofraids as well. Another candidate is an alleged descendant of Sitriuc mac Amlaíb's brother, Glún Iairn mac Amlaíb, King of Dublin. Specifically, according to a genealogical tract preserved by the seventeenth-century scribe Dubhaltach Óg Mac Fhirbhisigh, Glún Iairn had an otherwise unknown son named Sitriuc, a man who conceivably could have been Gofraid mac Sitriuc's father.

Another possibility is that Gofraid mac Sitriuc is identical to the contemporaneous like-named King of Dublin, Gofraid ua Ragnaill. The latter's name is recorded variously in the Irish annals: the Annals of Inisfallen calls him "", and "", whilst the Annals of Ulster calls him "". Although the evidence regarding Gofraid ua Ragnaill could indicate that his father was named Amlaíb, who was in turn the son of a man named Ragnall, the latter annal-entry literally states that he was the "son of Amlaíb or son of Ragnall", potentially indicating confusion in regard to his parentage. In any event, the annal-entries suggest that Gofraid ua Ragnaill was closely related to Echmarcach mac Ragnaill, King of Dublin and the Isles. Gofraid ua Ragnaill, therefore, could have been the son of a brother of Echmarcach named either Amlaíb or Sitriuc, or else perhaps even a son of Echmarcach himself.

Background

In the mid eleventh century, Diarmait mac Maíl na mBó, King of Leinster extended his authority into Dublin and the Isles at Echmarcach's expense. Specifically, Diarmait conquered Dublin in 1152, assumed the kingship, and thereby forced Echmarcach to flee "over the sea". About ten years later, Echmarcach appears to have been driven from Mann altogether, as the island was raided by Diarmait's son, Murchad, who received tribute and defeated a certain "", who may well have been Echmarcach himself. Echmarcach eventually died in Rome, in 1064 or 1065. On his death, the contemporary eleventh-century chronicler Marianus Scotus described him in Latin as "", a title that could either mean "King of the Isles", or "King of the Rhinns". If it represents the latter, it could be evidence that Echmarcach's once expansive sea-kingdom had gradually eroded to territory in Galloway only.

For twenty years after Echmarcach's expulsion from Dublin, Diarmait enjoyed the overlordship of the coastal kingdom, and the control of its highly rated army and prized fleet of warships. On his unexpected death in 1072, however, Toirdelbach Ua Briain, King of Munster invaded Leinster, and followed up on this military success with the acquisition of Dublin itself. There is uncertainty as to when Gofraid ua Ragnaill assumed the kingship of Dublin. On one hand, he could have succeeded Echmarcach before Diarmait's fall. On the other hand, Toirdelbach may have handed the region over to him following the Uí Briain takeover, or at least consented to Gofraid ua Ragnaill's establishment under his own overlordship.

Implications of familial uncertainty

The uncertainty surrounding Gofraid mac Sitriuc's parentage means that he could have been a member of any of several families. One such family—that of the kings Sitriuc mac Amlaíb and Glún Iairn—descended from Amlaíb Cúarán, King of Northumbria and Dublin. Another family was that of Echmarcach mac Ragnaill, a man whose parentage is uncertain. Whilst Echmarcach's family forged an alliance with the Uí Briain kindred, Diarmait—a bitter opponent of both Echmarcach and Donnchad mac Briain, King of Munster—appears to have cooperated with the descendants of Amlaíb Cúarán. In consequence, there are important implications in regard to Gofraid mac Sitriuc's familial identification.

As a descendant of Amlaíb Cúarán

In 1066, Haraldr Sigurðarson, King of Norway embarked upon an ill-fated invasion of England. Unfortunately for the Norwegians, their forces were utterly destroyed by the English in the subsequent Battle of Stamford Bridge. It was in the aftermath of this defeat that the Chronicle of Mann first makes note of Gofraid mac Sitriuc, and his ultimate successor, Gofraid Crobán. Specifically, this source states that, following the latter's flight from the slaughter at Stamford, Gofraid mac Sitriuc honourably received him, and granted him sanctuary. If Gofraid mac Sitriuc was indeed a descendant of Amlaíb Cúarán, his generosity towards Gofraid Crobán may have been conducted in the context of interfamily fellowship, since the latter could have been a descendant of Amlaíb Cúarán as well. In fact, Gofraid mac Sitriuc's apparent descent from Amlaíb Cúarán would also explain the circumstances surrounding his accession to the kingship of the Isles. For instance, only five years previously Diarmait's son appears to have overcome Echmarcach on Mann. The unlikelihood that Diarmait would have allowed a member of Echmarcach's family to continue to reign in the Isles suggests that Diarmait may have installed a descendant of Amlaíb Cúarán—in this case Gofraid mac Sitriuc—as his client in the Isles. Diarmait may have done exactly that in Dublin decades before when he expelled Echmarcach from Dublin in 1052, and possibly installed Ímar mac Arailt in his place as King of Dublin. The latter seems to have been not only a descendant of Amlaíb Cúarán, but also Gofraid Crobán's father, uncle, or brother.

According to the Chronicle of Mann, Gofraid mac Sitriuc died in about 1070, and was succeeded by his son, Fingal, a man who may have ruled for as long as nine years. In 1073, a year after Toirdelbach's seizure of Dublin, Fingal evidently repulsed an Irish-based invasion of Mann. The incursion is recorded by the Annals of Loch Cé and the Annals of Ulster, the latter of which states that the expedition was led by a certain Sigtryggr Óláfsson and two grandsons of Brian Bóruma, High King of Ireland. The precise identity of these three slain raiders is uncertain, as are the circumstances of the expedition itself. It is very likely, however, that the incursion was closely connected to the Uí Briain takeover of Dublin in the wake of Diarmait's death the year before. There is reason to suspect that Sigtryggr was a member of Echmarcach's family, perhaps a brother of Gofraid ua Ragnaill himself. It is further possible that this family also included Donnchad's wife, Cacht ingen Ragnaill. Certainly, Echmarcach's daughter, Mór, married Toirdelbach's son, Tadc. If the Uí Briain were indeed bound to a kindred comprising Gofraid mac Sitriuc, Sigtryggr, Cacht, and Echmarcach, it is possible that—following the Dublin ascendancy of the Uí Briain—Sigtryggr and his Uí Briain allies attempted to take what they regarded as his family's patrimony in the Isles.

As a kinsman of Echmarcach

If Gofraid mac Sitriuc is instead identical to Gofraid ua Ragnaill, and thus an apparent member of Echmarcach's family, it could mean that Gofraid ua Ragnaill had succeeded Echmarcach in Dublin and the Isles. This identification could mean that Sigtryggr—slain in the ill-fated invasion of Mann in 1073—was a descendant of Amlaíb Cúarán rather than a member of Echmarcach's family. In any case, numerous Irish annals report that two years after the assault on Mann, Gofraid ua Ragnaill's reign and life came to an end, with the Annals of Inisfallen recording that Toirdelbach banished Gofraid ua Ragnaill from Dublin altogether, and further stating that he died "beyond the sea", having assembled a "great fleet" to come to Ireland. If Gofraid mac Sitriuc and Gofraid ua Ragnaill are indeed identical, this annal-entry could be evidence that Toirdelbach ousted Gofraid ua Ragnaill from Dublin after failing to force him from Mann. If correct,  this annal-entry could also be evidence that Gofraid ua Ragnaill fell back to Mann after his expulsion from Dublin, and attempted to assemble a fleet of Islesmen there before his death.

Fingal and Gofraid Crobán

In about 1075, or 1079, the Chronicle of Mann reveals that Gofraid Crobán succeeded in conquering Mann following three sea-borne invasions. The circumstances surrounding this conquest are obscure. On one hand, it is possible that he overthrew Fingal, who may have been weakened by the invasion of 1073. On the other hand, the amiable relations between Gofraid Crobán and Fingal's father could suggest that, as long as Fingal lived his kingship was secure, and that it was only after his death that Gofraid Crobán attempted seize control. The chronicle only mentions Fingal once—in the context of succeeding his father—and he is not recorded in any other source. 

If Gofraid mac Sitriuc and Gofraid ua Ragnaill are indeed the same individual, the record of the latter's death in 1075 could have bearing on Gofraid Crobán's coup. Specifically, the latter gained the kingship of the Isles at about this time, and the chronicle places his campaigns in the context of combating the Manx themselves, making no mention of Fingal or a king at all during these conflicts. Gofraid Crobán, therefore, may have made his move whilst the kingship was vacant.

Despite the disappearance of Fingal from the historical record, there may be evidence that his descendants ruled in parts of Galloway. Specifically, in 1094, the Annals of Inisfallen records the death of a certain King of the Rhinns named "". On one hand, this could be evidence that Fingal's name was actually Congal. On the other hand, "" may simply represent the source's confusion between the names Fingal and Congal. In fact, the record of Echmarcach reigning as "" could be evidence that Echmarcach had formerly ruled this particular region. In any case, it is unknown if Macc Congail was independent from, or dependent upon, Gofraid Crobán's authority.

Notes

Citations

References

Primary sources

Secondary sources

11th-century rulers of the Kingdom of the Isles
11th-century monarchs in Europe
Rulers of the Kingdom of the Isles
Uí Ímair